Roca or ROCA may refer to:

Places
Roca (archaeological site), an archaeological site in Salento, Italy
Roca, Nebraska, a village in Nebraska, USA
Cabo da Roca

People
Alain Roca (born 1976), Cuban volleyball player
Blas Roca (1908–1987), Cuban politician
Joan Roca i Caball (1898-1976), Catalan politician
Joan Roca i Fontané (b. 1964), Catalan gourmet chef
 Jordi Roca i Fontané (b. 1978), Catalan gourmet chef
 Josep Roca i Fontané (b. 1966), Catalan sommelier 
Julio Argentino Roca, (1843-1914), Argentine president
Vladimiro Roca (born 1942), Cuban dissident

Businesses and organizations
Roca (company), a Spanish multinational producer of sanitary products
Republic of China Army
Rockland Center for the Arts, West Nyack, NY
Royal Observer Corps Association, an association of former ROC members in the UK
Russian Orthodox Church Abroad

Other uses
Almond Roca, brand of toffee made by Brown and Haley
Roca Formation (disambiguation), geologic units of that name
Radio Orienteering in a Compact Area
Risk of Ovarian Cancer Algorithm, an unproven ovarian cancer screening test
Roca Skolia, a fictional character from Catherine Asaro's Saga of the Skolian Empire
ROCA vulnerability, a cryptographic vulnerability
ROCA (Web programming), a web development architectural style for front-end applications.

See also
De la Roca (disambiguation)
Rocca (disambiguation)